Cristoforo Dall'Acqua (April 1, 1734 – November 10, 1787) was an Italian painter and engraver.

Dall'Acqua was born in Vicenza to a family of noble origins but of modest fortunes. He initially studied under Giovanni Antonio Remondini, a prominent printer in Bassano, originally from Padua, and worked with a number of artists including A. Orio, A. Gabrieli, A. Canals and F. Ricci. Dall'Acqua primarily worked on book illustrations and reproductions of paintings, although he later took commissions painting portraits.

References

18th-century Italian painters
Italian male painters
Italian engravers
1743 births
1787 deaths
Painters from Vicenza
18th-century Italian male artists